The Great John L. is a 1945 American biographical drama film directed by Frank Tuttle and written by James Edward Grant. The film stars Linda Darnell, Barbara Britton, Greg McClure, Otto Kruger, Wallace Ford and George Mathews. The film was released on May 25, 1945, by United Artists.

Plot

In 1880, when bareknuckle fighting is still condoned. John L. Sullivan chooses boxing over baseball and becomes known as "the Boston Strong Boy" after his victory over established prizefighter John Flood.

Sullivan's sweetheart, Kathy Harkness, refuses his marriage proposal, unhappy about how he has chosen to make a living. After he wins the heavyweight championship, Sullivan buys a tavern and begins drinking too much of his own product. He also meets New York singer Anne Livingston, marrying her on the rebound from Kathy and traveling the world, meeting British royalty while fighting abroad.

Sullivan's ego and alcoholism grow out of control. Anne realizes he still loves Kathy and leaves him, but Kathy still disapproves of his life. Sullivan is defeated by "Gentleman" Jim Corbett, loses the heavyweight crown and also loses his saloon, due to growing debts. Anne, too, becomes bankrupt as well as terminally ill. Sullivan vows to turn his life around, speaking on behalf of temperance unions as Kathy sees a glimmer of hope for their future.

Cast 
Linda Darnell as Anne Livingstone
Barbara Britton as Kathy Harkness
Greg McClure as John L. Sullivan
Otto Kruger as Richard Martin
Wallace Ford as McManus
George Mathews as John Flood
Robert Barrat as Billy Muldoon
J. M. Kerrigan as Father O'Malley
Joel Friedkin as Michael Sullivan 
Simon Semenoff as Mons. Claire
Harry Crocker as Arthur Brisbane
Rory Calhoun as James J. 'Gentleman Jim' Corbett 
Fritz Feld as Claire's Manager
Lee Sullivan as Mickey Steele 
Chester Conklin as Haggerty (uncredited)
Frank Darien as Fight Speculator (uncredited)
Leslie Denison as King Edward VII (uncredited)
Brandon Hurst as Valet (uncredited)

Critical response 
"A curious mixture of excitement and tedious drama make up the picture The Great John L, which arrived at the Globe on Saturday, a promising augury for the newly launched Bing Crosby Productions ... It is only after he loses to Corbett and his wife dies that “Honest John” marries his boyhood sweetheart and turns to the better life. But the process is overlong and occasionally boring."

"In his first independent production, Bing Crosby comes out with both fists swinging through a dramatization of the life of John L. Sullivan. When the pic is released, it should be a great day all around, for the Irish, as well as for the houses that run it. It’s straight boff from start to finish."

References

External links 
 

1945 films
American boxing films
American black-and-white films
1940s English-language films
Films scored by Victor Young
Films directed by Frank Tuttle
United Artists films
1940s biographical drama films
American biographical drama films
Films set in the 1880s
Films set in the 1890s
1940s historical drama films
American historical drama films
Biographical films about sportspeople
Cultural depictions of boxers
1945 drama films
1940s American films